Kristin Asbjørnsen (born 12 May 1971) is a Norwegian jazz singer and composer whose focus is on improvised music. She is known for musical projects like Dadafon including with Carl Haakon Waadeland, Krøyt, Kvitretten, and Nymark Collective among others.

Career 
Asbjørnsen was born in Lillehammer and educated at the Jazz Program at the Trondheim Conservatory of Music, Norwegian Academy of Music and the University of Oslo, Her style has its roots in the singer-songwriter tradition and includes elements from African music, World music, spirituals and jazz.

Wayfaring Stranger – A Spiritual Songbook (2006) was her first solo album, based on African-American spirituals, and the note sheets she inherited from singer Ruth Reese, her former song teacher. The album, as well as an extended European tour, was met with outstanding reviews. The album has received a Platinum Disc and nomination for the Spellemannprisen (Norwegian Music Awards equiv. to Grammy).

A live recording, The Bessie Smith Songbook, sheds new light on the songs of legendary jazz and blues singer, sung with the quartet Nymark Collective. In 2005 Asbjørnsen, Tord Gustavsen and Knut Aalefjær were asked to perform together at Molde International Jazz Festival. Two years later the concept was continued with a Norwegian tour. The concerts at Cosmopolite in Oslo and at the Nattjazz Festival in Bergen in 2007 were recorded. The Bessie Smith Songbook includes many of the early jazz standards, such as "Nobody Knows You When You're Down and Out" and "Oh, Daddy Blues".

Asbjørnsen made her international debut as a film score composer for the film Factotum, based on the novel of the same name by Charles Bukowski. Asbjørnsen has featured on a number of album releases, as well as a series of tours and festival performances in Europe. In 2009 she won the Babel Med Mondomix Award.

She is a member of the bands Dadafon and Krøyt, and was also in the Kvitretten, who split in 2001. In 2000 she received the Gammleng-prisen in the class jazz. For the album The Night Shines Like the Day she received the Spellemannprisen 2009 in open class. Asbjørnsen together with the world-renowned a cappella group Ladysmith Black Mambazo holding concerts in seven different townships in South Africa Back to eKasi, organized by, among others, Rikskonsertene.

Honors 
Spellemannprisen 1999 with Krøyt in open class for the album Low
Gammleng-prisen 2000 in the class jazz
Edvard Prize 2000 for the composition Silent from the EP Body Electric
Konon Prize 2006 for best film music
Spellemannprisen 2009 in open class for the album The Night Shines Like the Day
Babel Med Mondomix Award 2009

Discography

Solo albums

Collaborations 
Within Dadafon
1998: Coloured Moods (Rim Records)
2002: And I Can't Stand Still (Rim Records) 	
2002: Release Me (Via Music) 	
2002: Visitor (Via Music) 	
2004: Harbour (Universal Music/EmArcy Records) 	
2005: Lost Love Chords (Milan)

Within Krøyt
1997: Sub (Curling Legs) 	
1999: Low (Bergland Productions)
2001: Body Electric EP (Music Network Records) 	
2001: One Heart Is Too Small (Yonada Records)

Within Kvitretten
1996: Voices (Curling Legs)
1999: Everything Turns (Curling Legs) 	
2002: Kloden Er En Snurrebass Som Snurrer Oss (Curling Legs)

With other projects
2001: Smak Av Himmel, Spor Av Jord (Grappa Music), with various artists
2004: Seafarer's Song (EmArcy Records), with Ketil Bjørnstad
2008: Bessie Smith Revisited Live in Concert (Nymark Collective Records), with Nymark Collective
2009: Restored, Returned (ECM Records), within Tord Gustavsen Ensemble

References

External links 
 

Norwegian women jazz singers
Norwegian jazz composers
Musicians from Lillehammer
Spellemannprisen winners
Norwegian University of Science and Technology alumni
Living people
1971 births
20th-century Norwegian women singers
20th-century Norwegian singers
21st-century Norwegian women singers
21st-century Norwegian singers
Krøyt members